The following is a list of most watched United States television broadcasts of 1988 (single-network only) according to Nielsen Media Research.

Most watched by week

References

Most watched 1988
1988 in American television